Žarkovac is a village in Serbia. It is situated in the Ruma municipality, in the Srem District, Vojvodina province. The village has a Serb ethnic majority and its population numbering 1,102 people (2002 census).

Name

In Serbian, the village is known as Žarkovac (Жарковац), in Hungarian as Szerémszolnok, and in Croatian as Žarkovac.

Historical population

1961: 1,089
1971: 934
1981: 955
1991: 915
2002: 1,102

References
Slobodan Ćurčić, Broj stanovnika Vojvodine, Novi Sad, 1996.

See also
List of places in Serbia
List of cities, towns and villages in Vojvodina

Populated places in Syrmia